Vladimir Bukal (November 1, 1939 – August 21, 2008) was a Croatian chess player holding the title of International master.

He played in many Yugoslav and Croatian championships, winning the latter in 1978.

In 1985 he won the B-section of the "Banco di Roma" tournament in Rome (Ulf Andersson won the A-section). Twice winner of the B-section of the Reggio Emilia chess tournament (1988/89 and 1989/90).

Bukal achieved his best results in Senior tournaments:
 2001 – bronze medal at the World Senior Championship at Arco  (Janis Klovans won the event);
 2002 – gold medal at the European Senior Championship at Saint-Vincent;
 2003 – bronze medal at the World Senior Championship at Bad Zwischenahn (Yuri Shabanov won the event).

He was a member of the HAŠK Mladost Zagreb chess club.

His son Vladimir Bukal Jr. (born in 1975) is also an International master.

References

External links
  
 Vladimir Bukal profile and games at 365Chess.com

Bukal, Vladimir
Bukal, Vladimir
Bukal, Vladimir
Bukal, Vladimir